John Turke was an English medieval college Fellow and university chancellor.

Turke was a Fellow of Merton College, Oxford, and Chancellor of the University of Oxford between 1376 and 1377. He was a Doctor of Divinity and later Canon of Salisbury Cathedral.

References

Year of birth unknown
Year of death unknown
Fellows of Merton College, Oxford
Chancellors of the University of Oxford
14th-century English Roman Catholic priests
Salisbury Cathedral